The men's Greco-Roman lightweight competition at the 1936 Summer Olympics in Berlin took place from 6 August to 9 August at the Deutschlandhalle. Nations were limited to one competitor. This weight class was limited to wrestlers weighing up to 66kg.

This Greco-Roman wrestling competition continued to use the "bad points" elimination system introduced at the 1928 Summer Olympics, with a slight modification. Each round featured all wrestlers pairing off and wrestling one bout (with one wrestler having a bye if there were an odd number). The loser received 3 points if the loss was by fall or unanimous decision and 2 points if the decision was 2-1 (this was the modification from prior years, where all losses were 3 points). The winner received 1 point if the win was by decision and 0 points if the win was by fall. At the end of each round, any wrestler with at least 5 points was eliminated.

Schedule

Results

Round 1

Four wrestlers made it through the first round with 0 bad points with wins by fall. The five other winners by decision each received 1 point. Three of those decisions were split decisions, with the losers earning 2 points. The other two decisions, and the four bouts determined by fall, resulted in six men finishing the round with 3 points. Of that last group, Scheitler was injured and unable to continue.

 Bouts

 Points

Round 2

No wrestler was able to maintain a 0-point score through the second round. Four finished the round with 1 point (one win by fall, one win by decision). Borlovan had 2 points (both wins by decision). Five men had achieved 3 points, by various means; three had 4 points. Half of the eight bouts eliminated the losers with a second loss.

 Bouts

 Points

Round 3

Herda and Koskela continued in the lead with 1 point each, winning by bye or fall to maintain their scores. The other two men who started the round with one point each won by decision, moving to 2 points. Molfino was the only one of the wrestlers who started with 3 points to win (by fall, staying at 3 points); the other four were eliminated after losing in this round. The wrestlers who started with 4 points fared better, with two winning by fall to stay alive, one losing to be eliminated, and none suffering the misfortune of being eliminated by winning via decision. Borlovan, who started the round with 2 points, was eliminated by Koskela in a loss by fall.

 Bouts

 Points

Round 4

The top four wrestlers coming into the round either won by fall or had a bye and therefore there was no change to their scores of 1 or 2 points. The bottom three wrestlers each lost by fall and were eliminated. The official report awards Dahl 6th place, so Szajewski takes 7th by default.

 Bouts

 Points

Round 5

The bout between Koskela and Herda matched up a pair of wrestlers who started with 1 point and thus neither could be eliminated; Koskela took a split decision, resulting in him advancing with 2 points and Herda going to 3 points. Väli and Olofsson each started with 2 points, meaning a fall or unanimous decision would eliminate the loser but a split decision would not. Väli won by fall, staying at 2 points and eliminating Olofsson.

 Bouts

 Points

Round 6

Koskela defeated Väli to secure the gold medal. The split decision kept Väli from elimination at 4 points (a fall or unanimous decision would have given Väli 5, eliminating him and ending the competition after this round with Herda as the silver medalist). Koskela and Herda finished the round at 3 points each, but Koskela had already defeated Herda in round 5 and thus held the tie-breaker even if Herda made it through his bout with Väli in the next round without earning any more bad points.

 Bouts

 Points

Round 7

The round 7 bout between Väli and Herda was for silver and bronze. Herda prevailed by decision.

 Bouts

 Points

References

Wrestling at the 1936 Summer Olympics